"Assume a can opener" is a catchphrase used to mock economists and other theorists who base their conclusions on unjustified or oversimplified assumptions.

The phrase derives from a joke which dates to at least 1970 and possibly originated with British economists. The first book mentioning it is likely Economics as a Science (1970) by Kenneth E. Boulding:

There is a story that has been going around about a physicist, a chemist, and an economist who were stranded on a desert island with no implements and a can of food. The physicist and the chemist each devised an ingenious mechanism for getting the can open; the economist merely said, "Assume we have a can opener"!

The phrase was popularized in a 1981 book and has become sufficiently well known that many writers on economic topics use it as a catchphrase without further explanation.

Examples of usage
The joke and its application to economists were taken up in the 1981 book Paper Money by George Goodman (under the pseudonym "Adam Smith"), wherein he applied the story to the then-tendency of economists to assume that inflation would go away, and mocked the notion that economists are "the high priests of this esoteric mystery." In contrast, he asks "why the economists are always wrong." The phrase "assume a can opener" became "his nagging accusation against the deductive logic and analytical models of economists."

President Ronald Reagan told the joke to students and faculty at Purdue University on April 9, 1987 saying: "It seems an economist, a chemist, and an engineer were stranded on a desert island. And between them they had only a single can of beans, but no can opener. The engineer suggested that he climb a palm tree to a precise height, then throw the beans at a precise distance, at a precise angle. 'And when the can hits,' he said, 'it will split open.' 'No,' said the chemist. 'We'll leave the can in the sun until the heat causes the beans to expand so much the can will explode.' 'Nonsense,' said the economist. 'Using either method we'd lose too many beans. According to my plan, there will be no mess or fuss and not a single bean will be lost.' Well, the engineer and the chemist said, 'We're certainly willing to consider it. What's your plan?' And the economist answered, 'Well, first assume we have a can opener.'"

Italian finance minister Tommaso Padoa-Schioppa used the phrase in 2006 to illustrate that "Very often, when economists comment, they assume politics away." It has been used in Australia to describe "a treasurer who has lost all touch with reality" and politicians "assuming away" the problem of getting a global greenhouse gas deal. It was used in India to describe American economic policy toward China.

It has been extended beyond economics to describe diplomats and negotiators working toward peace in the Middle East, who have been described as behaving "as if the conflict were just a big misunderstanding" and "[assuming] leaders who did not exist, as a way to conjure a preferable reality."

See also

References 

Criticisms of economics
Economics catchphrases
Professional humor
1970 neologisms